Watertown may refer to:

Places in China
In China, a water town is a type of ancient scenic town known for its waterways.

Places in the United States
Watertown, Connecticut, a New England town
Watertown (CDP), Connecticut, the central village in the town
Watertown, Florida
Watertown, Massachusetts
Watertown Township, Clinton County, Michigan
Watertown Township, Tuscola County, Michigan
Watertown Township, Sanilac County, Michigan
Watertown, Minnesota
Watertown Township, Minnesota
Watertown, New York
Watertown, New York (town), adjacent to the city
Watertown, Ohio
Watertown, South Dakota
Watertown, Tennessee
Watertown, Wisconsin
Watertown (town), Wisconsin

Military installations
Area 51, Nevada; nicknamed "Watertown"
Watertown Air Force Station, Maine; a USAF general surveillance radar station with an aircraft control and warning squadron
Watertown Arsenal, Massachusetts; Formerly Used Defense Site MA19799F17770
Watertown Bomb Plot, Maine; the callsign of a USAF Radar Bomb Scoring station on Fort Drum
Watertown Precision Bombing Range, South Dakota; "206mi. NNW of Sioux AAB"

Buildings
Punggol Watertown, an integrated development in Singapore.
Watertown Brand Outlet Centre (previously Harbour Town) in West Perth, Australia

Music
Watertown (album), a 1970 album by Frank Sinatra
"Watertown", a song on the album Earth is Big (2000) by Logan Whitehurst

See also 
Waterton (disambiguation)
Víziváros (Watertown), Esztergom, Hungary
Waterdown, Ontario, now part of the city of Hamilton